Vladislav Malkevich (born 4 December 1999) is a Belarusian professional footballer who plays for BATE Borisov.

Honours
BATE Borisov
Belarusian Premier League champion: 2016, 2018
Belarusian Cup winner: 2020–21
Belarusian Super Cup winner: 2017, 2022

References

External links 
 
 
 Profile at BATE Borisov website

1999 births
Living people
Belarusian footballers
Association football defenders
Belarus international footballers
FC BATE Borisov players
FC Slavia Mozyr players